Jangal Gauri is a village in Gorakhpur, Uttar Pradesh, India.

References

Villages in Gorakhpur district